Terrence "Terry" Richardson (birth unknown) is an English former professional rugby league footballer who played in the 1970s and 1980s.

Playing career

Castleford

At the end of his career, he spent one season at Kent Invicta, making eight appearances.

International honours
Terry Richardson won a cap for England while at Castleford in the 17–4 victory over Wales at Old Craven Park on 18 March 1981.

References

External links
(archived by web.archive.org) Profile at thecastlefordtigers.co.uk

Living people
English rugby league players
Rugby league wingers
Castleford Tigers players
Kent Invicta players
England national rugby league team players
Year of birth missing (living people)
Place of birth missing (living people)